Ray Krebbs is a fictional character in the American television series Dallas, played by Steve Kanaly from 1978 to 1989. Ray Krebbs is the illegitimate son of Texas oil baron Jock Ewing. He later appeared in the reunion movie Dallas: War of the Ewings (1998) and made guest star appearances in the 2012 continuation of Dallas.

Background
Ray Krebbs was born on October 18, 1945, in Emporia, Kansas. His alleged father, Amos Krebbs, left his mother, Margaret Hunter Krebbs when Ray was 3 years old. At age 15, Ray was sent to the Southfork Ranch in Dallas with a letter from his recently deceased mother asking Jock Ewing to help Ray out. Ray's mother, a United States Army Air Corps nurse, was wi

S

Storylines

Original series
Ray worked for Jock maintaining Southfork as its ranch foreman. Initially, Ray was a bit of a rogue, dating the much younger Lucy Ewing on the sly, and collaborating with J.R. Ewing to break up J.R's younger brother Bobby and his new wife (and Ray's old flame) Pamela Barnes. Despite this, Ray had a good heart and became a trusted and upstanding friend of the Ewing family. Eventually, Amos Krebbs showed up in Dallas in 1980 and revealed that he was not Ray's father, reading out information in Margaret Hunter's diary to Jock Ewing, which revealed that Jock was Ray's father. Jock welcomed Ray into the Ewing family and publicly acknowledged Ray as his son. Because of the incestuous implications, Ray's prior relationship with Lucy was never referenced again.

Ray eventually found happiness with the politician and the widow of former Texas governor Sam Culver, Donna Culver Krebbs, and they married in 1981, but the marriage began to collapse, and in 1985, they separated. Donna found out she was pregnant, and Ray tried to reconcile with her, but she refused. During the "Dream Season", Ray and Donna adopted a deaf boy named Tony after Donna miscarried their child with Down syndrome; the storyline included Ray initially wanting Donna to get an abortion. By 1987, they had divorced, and Donna had given birth to a daughter named Margaret Krebbs, named after Ray's deceased mother.

In 1988, Ray married Jenna Wade after Jenna had given birth to his half-brother Bobby's son, Lucas. Their marriage and the decision that Ray adopt Lucas caused some acrimony between the once-close Ray and Bobby, but they made amends and resumed their brotherly relationship. Eventually, trouble with Jenna's teenage daughter Charlie caused friction between Ray and Jenna. After sending Charlie to boarding school in Europe, Ray and Jenna decided to move to Switzerland permanently, this also happened because Ray cheated on Jenna with another woman, and the only way she might forgive him was if they move away. Clayton and Miss Ellie Farlow visited them before they also left Dallas, tired of the constant battles within the family.

In 1991, Ray returned for the final episode "Conundrum", and in J.R.'s dream, Ray has a very unhappy working life, having never found out Jock was his father. Ray is also limping heavily due to rodeo injuries (stock footage is shown of Ray in the rodeo won by Dusty Farlow in season three). Seeing Ray working to make ends meet on a ranch and also in a bar (where he is treated poorly), J.R. admits, "I kinda feel sorry for him." Later in the dream, it is Ray's birthday, and despite having a poor work life, Ray has a very happy family life and even has a son named Jock. J.R. seems genuinely happy for him, bearing in mind this is a dream. Ray also appeared sporting a mustache, something he never had during his actual time at Dallas.

Reunion film
In 1998, Ray (with dyed brown hair) makes a shock return in Dallas: War of the Ewings when he helps Bobby and Sue Ellen in a barroom brawl. It is later revealed Ray is broke as the Krebbs ranch was remortgaged several times (how Ray owned the ranch again is unknown, as it was last seen owned by Michelle Stevens in 1991). Bobby helps him out until J.R. unwittingly helps Ray pocket $50 million for the land, which was auctioned to J.R.'s bitter rival Carter McKay. The land was valued at only $10 million but happened to be a source of crude oil, which started a bidding war between J.R. and McKay.  McKay's bid won the auction, but J.R. later revealed that in Jock's will, the mineral rights were deeded to the Ewings' trust, thereby making the oil inaccessible to Carter McKay.

2012 revival
Ray appeared as a guest star in the continuation of Dallas. In 2012, Ray attended his nephew Christopher's wedding to Rebecca Sutter (or Pamela Rebecca Barnes) and later appeared at Bobby's final Southfork barbecue. In 2013, Ray attended J.R.'s funeral at Southfork, where he said that he could never make Jock proud the way J.R. did. Ray was mentioned in J.R.'s will but only with the words "Hello Ray". In 2014, Ray appeared again at Southfork to attend the wedding of his nephew John Ross to Pamela Rebecca Barnes.

Since Ray's return to Dallas, no mention was made of Jenna, his daughter Margaret, stepdaughter Charlie, or adopted son Lucas.

References

Bibliography

External links
Ray Krebbs Biography at Ultimate Dallas.com

Krebbs, Ray
Krebbs, Ray
Krebbs, Ray